Ak Rural District is a rural district (dehestan) in Esfarvarin District, Takestan County, Qazvin Province, Iran. At the 2006 census, its population was 3,484, in 834 families.  The rural district has 10 villages.

References 

Rural Districts of Qazvin Province
Takestan County